The 2011–12 Czech First League, known as the Gambrinus liga for sponsorship reasons, was the 19th season of the Czech Republic's top-tier football league. It began on 29 July 2011 and was originally due to end on 26 May 2012, although due to the Czech Republic's qualification for UEFA Euro 2012, the end of the season was brought forward to 12 May 2012. Viktoria Plzeň were the defending champions, having won their first Czech Republic championship the previous season.

Sparta Prague started the season with eight consecutive wins, the first such occurrence in league history. Sparta broke their own record when they won their ninth straight league match and opened up a 10-point lead at the top of the table.

The title was decided on the last day of the season, with Liberec hosting Viktoria Plzeň in the knowledge that a win for either team would seal the title, with a draw being enough for Liberec to retain first place. In front of a sold-out stadium at Stadion u Nisy, Liberec held the visitors to a goalless draw, winning the league for the third time since 2002.

Teams
Ústí nad Labem and Zbrojovka Brno were relegated to the 2011–12 Czech 2. Liga after finishing last and second to last, respectively, in the 2010–11 season. Ústi nad Labem therefore immediately returned to the second tier, while Brno completed a nineteen-year tenure in the top flight.

The relegated terms were replaced by 2010–11 2. Liga champions Dukla Prague and Viktoria Žižkov. Viktoria Žižkov returned after a two-year absence, while Dukla Prague made their debut in the league; however, the Dukla Prague name returned to the league after seventeen seasons, with a club of the same name having played in the top Czech football division until then. The newly promoted clubs were granted licenses to play top-division football on 13 June 2011.

Viktoria Žižkov became the first team to be relegated on 5 May 2012 after Ostrava beat Příbram.

Stadia and locations

Notes:
 Ďolíček stadion does not meet the football association criteria, therefore Bohemians are forced to play at Synot Tip Arena.
 FK Dukla Prague played one home match at Stadion Evžena Rošického due to the implementation of under-soil heating at Juliska.

Personnel and kits

Note: Flags indicate national team as has been defined under FIFA eligibility rules. Players may hold more than one non-FIFA nationality.

 1 According to current revision of List of Czech Football League managers

Managerial changes

 Slavia manager František Straka resigned on 8 March. Assistant manager Martin Poustka was appointed to serve as caretaker manager for the next match against Jablonec, which was just three days later.

League table

Results

Top goalscorers

See also
 2011–12 Czech Cup
 2011–12 Czech 2. Liga

References

External links
 Official website 

Cze
2011-12
1